Hypochrysops delicia, the moonlight jewel, is a member of the family Lycaenidae. It is found in eastern Australia.

The wingspan is about 40 mm. The wings are iridescent turquoise on top, shading to black at the margins.

The larvae feed on Acacia species, including A. binervia, A. dealbata, A. flavescens, A. implexa, A. irrorata, A. leiocalyx, A. mearnsii, A. melanoxylon, A. parramattensis, A. pycnantha and A. spectabilis. It is usually attended by Crematogaster species. The larvae are brown and hairy with a dark dorsal stripe and diagonal markings, as well as a black head. It reaches a length of about 25 mm when fully grown.

Subspecies
H. d. delicia - Hewitson, 1875 (southern Queensland to central New South Wales)
H. d. delos - Waterhouse & Lyell, 1914 (southern New South Wales to Victoria)
H. d. duaringae - Waterhouse, 1903 (central Queensland)
H. d. regina - Grose-Smith & Kirby, 1895 (Moluccas)

References

Luciini
Butterflies described in 1875
Butterflies of Australia
Taxa named by William Chapman Hewitson